Lord William Desmond Taylor (3 January 1904 – 2 December 1989) was a British archaeologist, specialising in Mycenaean Greece.

Biography 
William Desmond Taylour was the second son of Geoffrey Taylour, 4th Marquess of Headfort, and the Irish Gaiety Girl Rosie Boote. He was born on January 3, 1904, at Pennington House (Lymington, Hampshire), where his parents lived after their scandalous wedding, but was raised in the family estate Headfort House, in Meath County, Ireland.

He attended Harrow School and, after a short spell in the diplomatic service, began a career in finance, first on Wall Street and then in London. During the World War II, Taylour fought in North Africa among the 2nd Derbyshire Yeomanry, where he gained the rank of captain.

After the war, he joined the Allied Control Commission in Germany until 1947, when he enrolled at Trinity College, Cambridge. A keen archaeologist since his time at Harrow, he devoted himself to the study of Mycenaean pottery, the subject of his doctoral thesis published in 1958. He studied under Grahame Clark and Glyn Daniel. From 1949 onwards, he took part in numerous excavations in Greece, in particular at Mycenae with Alan Wace, and at Pylos with Carl Blegen.

After Wace's death in 1957, Lord William Taylour became director of the British School at Athens excavations at Mycenae, working jointly with Ioánnis Papadimitríou and George Mylonas of the Archaeological Society of Athens. Their work led to an in-depth knowledge of the citadel of Mycenae and the development of the complex of buildings that he described as the cult centre. His 1964 The Mycenaeans, one of the first major studies of the Mycenaean civilisation, quickly became a reference. Between 1959 and 1977, he also excavated the site of Ayios Stephanos in Laconia, a small Bronze Age harbour, demonstrating the commercial links between Minoan Crete and mainland Greece.

In 1981, together with Elizabeth French, he inaugurated the first volume of Well Built Mycenae, a publication that continued until 2012.

Resources 
 
 Mycenae excavation and publication archive (University of Cambridge Faculty of Classics Archives)

References

1904 births
1989 deaths
British archaeologists
Archaeologists of the Bronze Age Aegean
Mycenaean archaeologists
Alumni of Trinity College, Cambridge
People educated at Harrow School